Dyskobolia Grodzisk Wielkopolski, previously Groclin Grodzisk Wielkopolski, was a Polish football club based in Grodzisk Wielkopolski, Greater Poland Voivodeship.

History 
Dyskobolia Grodzisk Wielkopolski was founded on 30 April 1922. Its logo shows the Discobolus.

After several decades in lower league football, the club was taken over in the mid-1990s by Zbigniew Drzymała, president of the Inter Groclin Auto company, and enjoyed an instant string of promotions culminating in the promotion to top level football in 1997.

Not having its own youth backbone, the club was dependent on players predominantly over 30 years of age, mostly with former league experience. After performing reasonably in the autumn period of the 1997/98 season, they experienced a sudden drop in form, which resulted in relegation. However within a year Dyskobolia was in the top flight again. Although now having many younger and more success-hungry players in the squad, the club performed disastrously in the autumn of 1999, garnering just five points from fifteen games. An unexpected (and some say suspicious) form increase in the spring resulted in eight victories in a row, which was more than enough to fight off relegation. The club has been in the top flight ever since, enjoying second place honors on two occasions (2003 and 2005). Managers have included Dusan Radolsky, although Andrzej Janeczek was the current coach. The first runner-up title made them eligible to play in the UEFA Cup, in which they eliminated Hertha BSC and Manchester City (with three goals in four games) before falling to Girondins Bordeaux. Their second UEFA Cup run was less successful, resulting in a first round exit against RC Lens.

Dyskobolia was original winner of the 2004–05 Polish Cup edition. By the resolution of the PZPN management board of September 2, 2020, the team was deprived of this title in connection with proven cases of corruption. In July 2008 Dyskobolia announced its intention to merge with Polonia Warsaw after the expected merger with Śląsk Wrocław fell through. Polonia replaced Dyskobolia in the Ekstraklasa while the new Dyskobolia team joined the IV liga (the 5-th tier of the Polish league pyramid).

In the 2015–16 season, Dyskobolia Grodzisk Wielkopolski played in the regional league (klasa okręgowa), but withdrew after the autumn round. In the following seasons, a team called Nasza Dyskobolia Grodzisk Wielkopolski started to play at the lower levels, referring to the club's tradition.

Colours 

The club colours were green and white.

Achievements 
 Ekstraklasa:
 Runners-up (2): 2003, 2005
 Polish Cup:
 Winner (1): 2007
 Ekstraklasa Cup:
Winner (2): 2007, 2008

Fans
Dyskobolia, although no longer attracted as many fans as in the Second Division and Ekstraklasa years, possessed a small but loyal group of active supporters called Szczuny z Landu.

The fans had two fan-clubs outside their home town, in Rakoniewice and Kąkolewo, and the fans had a strong friendship with fans of Górnik Łęczyca.

Back in the top flight they competed in the Greater Poland Derby against Lech Poznań and Amica Wronki. The latter were widely considered to be their greatest rivals, a rivalry which has been renewed since the Amica's phoenix-predecessor club Błękitni Wronki has been re-established in 2007, the two frequently playing in the same division.

Notable players 
Internationally capped players
 Mariusz Lewandowski, defender, capped for the Poland national football team
 Sebastian Mila, midfield, capped for the Poland national football team
 Radosław Sobolewski, midfield, capped for the Poland national football team
 Piotr Świerczewski, midfield, capped for the Poland national football team
 Grzegorz Rasiak, striker, capped for the Poland national football team
 Ivica Križanac, defender, capped for the Croatia national football team
 Mićo Vranješ, defender, capped for the Yugoslavia national under-21 football team
 Radosław Majewski, midfield, capped for the Poland national football team

Dyskobolia in Europe

See also 

 Football in Poland
 List of football teams

References

External links 
 https://web.archive.org/web/20090803213256/http://www.dyskobolia.eu/

 
Association football clubs established in 1922
1922 establishments in Poland